Liborius Ndumbukuti Nashenda, O.M.I. (born 4 April 1959 in Oshikuku, Omusati Region) is a Namibian Roman Catholic archbishop.

He was ordained a priest on June 25, 1988. On November 5, 1998, he was appointed Auxiliary Bishop of Windhoek, and was ordained on February 7, 1999, as the Titular Bishop of Pertusa. On November 14, 2004, he became Archbishop of Windhoek, serving from St. Mary's Cathedral.On Heroes' Day 2014 he was conferred the Most Brilliant Order of the Sun, Second Class by President Hifikepunye Pohamba.

References

Notes

Further reading

Catholic Hierarchy

1959 births
Living people
Christianity in Namibia
Namibian Roman Catholic archbishops
People from Omusati Region
Roman Catholic bishops of Windhoek
Roman Catholic archbishops of Windhoek
Missionary Oblates of Mary Immaculate